This is a list of members of the Western Australian Legislative Assembly between the 1943 election and the 1947 election, together known as the 18th Parliament. In January 1945, the Nationalists, officially known as the National Party of Western Australia, reformed as the Liberal Party (Western Australian Division) under the leadership of Robert McDonald, and all Nationalist MLAs' allegiances changed accordingly.

Notes
 On 9 December 1943, John Tonkin, the member for North-East Fremantle, was appointed as Minister for Education and Social Services in the Willcock Ministry. He was therefore required to resign and contest a ministerial by-election on 17 December 1943, in which he was returned unopposed.
 On 16 February 1944, the Country member for Swan, Richard Sampson, died. Independent Country candidate Ray Owen won the resulting by-election on 29 April 1944.
 At the 1943 state election, Labor candidate William Telfer defeated the sitting Country member Ignatius Boyle by 15 votes. The Court of Disputed Returns ordered a fresh election for 1 July 1944, at which Telfer won a 298-vote majority against Boyle.
 On 9 December 1944, the Labor member for Victoria Park, Howard Raphael, died. Independent candidate William Read won the resulting by-election on 10 February 1945.
 At the 1943 election, the Labor candidate for Greenough, John Newton, a farmer from Mingenew who had enlisted in the RAAF as a Flight Lieutenant in 1941 and left for the United Kingdom in 1942, unexpectedly defeated the sitting Country member, William Patrick. On 14 January 1944, he was reported missing after a raid on Germany. On 31 July 1945, a panel of members was appointed to enquire whether a vacancy existed, and on 27 September 1945, the seat was declared vacant. Liberal candidate David Brand won the resulting by-election on 27 October 1945, becoming the first person to win an Australian election under the new Liberal banner.
 On 3 August 1945, William Marshall, the member for Murchison, was appointed as a Minister in the Wise Ministry. He was therefore required to resign and contest a ministerial by-election on 17 August 1945, in which he was returned unopposed.

Members of Western Australian parliaments by term